Q'ara Qullu (Aymara q'ara bare, bald, qullu mountain, "bare mountain", also  spelled Khara Khollu, Khara Kkollu) is a  mountain in the Andes of Bolivia. It is situated in the La Paz Department, Omasuyos Province, Achacachi Municipality. Q'ara Qullu lies south of Janq'u Uma and Janq'u K'ark'a of the Cordillera Real. San Francisco Lake is at its feet, east of it.

References 

Mountains of La Paz Department (Bolivia)